Under Wraps is the 15th studio album by the band Jethro Tull, released in 1984.  The songs' subject matter is heavily influenced by bandleader Ian Anderson's love of espionage fiction. It was controversial among fans of the band due to its electronic/synthesizer-based sound, particularly the use of electronic drums. Dave Pegg has been quoted as saying that the tracks cut from the sessions for Broadsword and the Beast would have made a better album, while Martin Barre has referred to it as one of his personal favourite Tull albums. The album reached No. 76 on the Billboard 200 and No. 18 on the UK Albums Chart. The single "Lap of Luxury" reached No. 30.

Production

Unlike earlier albums where Anderson was the sole songwriter, Under Wraps was the first Jethro Tull album since This Was where the majority of songs were co-written between all members of the band, primarily Peter-John Vettese.

This is also the only Jethro Tull album that features no live drummer; all the percussion tracks were programmed electronically. After the recording Doane Perry joined the band on tour and became their permanent drummer thereafter.

Release

The original 1984 release had 11 tracks, with "Astronomy", "Tundra", "Automotive Engineering" and "General Crossing" only appearing on the cassette version. Of these extra tracks, "General Crossing" became the first Jethro Tull track never to be released on vinyl, as "Astronomy", "Tundra" and "Automotive Engineering" all appeared on the 12-inch single release of "Lap of Luxury".

The CD editions of the album carry all 15 tracks. The 2005 enhanced CD also contains a QuickTime video for "Lap of Luxury".

Live performances
For the 1984 tour to promote Under Wraps, Jethro Tull offered artistic stage production as usual. In a manner quite similar to the Thick as a Brick tour, the roadies appeared onstage sweeping the floor, counting the audience and studying the place. All band members and instruments were covered in "wraps", with Anderson then releasing them and the music starting. Anderson was suffering from vocal problems and was warned by his doctors not to tour. Anderson ignored this advice and went on tour, straining his throat in the process of performing the album's vocally demanding songs, resulting in surgery and an extended hiatus from the band.

Track listing

Original Vinyl

CD

Personnel

Jethro Tull
 Ian Anderson – vocals, flute, acoustic guitar, drum programming, Fairlight CMI
 Martin Barre – electric guitar
 Dave Pegg – bass guitar, double bass
 Peter-John Vettese – keyboards, electronic programming

Additional personnel
 Trevor Key - cover photo, photography
 John Pasche - artwork, cover design
 Sheila Rock - photography

Charts

References

External links
 
  (enhanced)

Jethro Tull (band) albums
1984 albums
Chrysalis Records albums
Albums produced by Ian Anderson